Thrombosis Research is an international peer-reviewed medical journal published by Elsevier
with a goal of rapid dissemination of new information on thrombosis, hemostasis, and vascular biology to advance science and clinical care. The journal publishes peer-reviewed original research, along with reviews, editorials, and opinions and critics. Both basic and clinical studies are published. Publication of research which will lead to novel approaches in diagnosis, therapy, prognosis and prevention of thrombotic and hemorrhagic diseases is given high priority.

Its impact factor as of 2022 is 10.407, has an average review time of 5.7 weeks and an average publication time of 0.7 weeks. The journal was established in 1972 by A.L. Copley.

Editors:
S. Bates,
H.H. Versteeg

Senior Editor:
F.A. Klok

Associate Editors:
S. Barco,
L. M. Baumann Kreuziger,
B. Bikdeli,
V. Bogdanov,
S. Gando,
A. Iorio, 
M. Lordkipanidzé, 
C. G. Santos-Gallego,
H. Schulze,
E. Stavrou,
V Tagalakis,
R. Wu,
G. Young.

Links
https://www.journals.elsevier.com/thrombosis-research/most-cited-articles
http://www.journals.elsevier.com/thrombosis-research/
http://www.thrombosisresearch.com/
https://twitter.com/thrombosisrese1

Cardiology journals
Publications established in 1972
Elsevier academic journals
Monthly journals
Hybrid open access journals